Jaime Pedro Kohl (born 12 December 1954) is a Brazilian Roman Catholic bishop.

Ordained to the priesthood on 2 September 1984, Kohl was named bishop of the Roman Catholic Diocese of Osório, Brazil on 15 November 2006.

References 

1954 births
Living people
People from Rio Grande do Sul
21st-century Roman Catholic bishops in Brazil
Roman Catholic bishops of Osório